The 2013 3 Hours of Sepang was the fourth and final round of the 2013 Asian Le Mans Series season. It took place on December 8, 2013 at the Sepang International Circuit in Selangor, Malaysia.

Race result
Race result is as follows. Class winners in bold.

References

External links
 

2013 Asian Le Mans Series season
3 Hours